Pantilius is a genus of true bugs belonging to the family Miridae.

The species of this genus are found in Europe.

Species:
 Pantilius gonoceroides Reuter, 1903 
 Pantilius hayashii Miyamoto & Yasunaga, 1989 
 Pantilius tunicatus (Fabricius, 1781)

References

Miridae